Bolstad is a surname. Notable people with the surname include:

Bjørn Bolstad Skjelbred (born 1970), composer, arranger, improviser and teacher
David Bolstad (1969–2011), New Zealand representative woodchopper
Eivind Nævdal-Bolstad (born 1987), Norwegian politician for the Conservative Party
Øivind Bolstad (1905–1979), Norwegian playwright and novelist
Steve Bolstad, Democratic Party member of the Montana House of Representatives
Torleiv Bolstad (1915–1979), Norwegian musician and Hardanger fiddle player

See also
Les Bolstad Golf Course, golf course owned by the University of Minnesota